John Carr (1723–1807) was a prolific English architect, best known for Buxton Crescent in Derbyshire and Harewood House in West Yorkshire. Much of his work was in the Palladian style. In his day he was considered to be the leading architect in the north of England.

Life
He was born in Horbury, near Wakefield, England, the eldest of nine children and the son of a master mason, under whom he trained. He started an independent career in 1748 and continued until shortly before his death. John Carr was Lord Mayor of York in 1770 and 1785. Towards the end of his life Carr purchased an estate at Askham Richard, near York, to which he retired. On 22 February 1807 he died at Askham Hall. He was buried in St Peter and St Leonard's Church, Horbury, which he had designed and paid for.

Career
Carr decided to remain in Yorkshire rather than move to London because he calculated that there was ample patronage and the wealth to sustain it. No job was too small. His largest work, only partially finished, was the Hospital de Santo António in Oporto, Portugal. In order to maximise his income, he kept his staff to the minimum. His earliest assistant was William Lindley (architect 1739–1818), who from 1774 developed an independent practice. He was followed by the elder Peter Atkinson (1735-1805) and possibly his son Peter the younger (1780-1843). Carr's nephew William Carr also assisted his uncle in his latter years. These architectural assistants had 'boys' to help them in turn. Carr rarely delegated matters that others would regard as too trivial, and in consequence Carr had to travel immense distances mostly on horse back. However the frequency of such visits brought him into regular contact with his many clients to mutual advantage.

Carr's own favourite work was the Crescent at Buxton in Derbyshire, an early example of multifunctional architecture. As well as hotels and lodging houses, it contained Assembly Rooms, shops, a post office and a public promenade all under one roof. On a smaller scale, the same is true of his Newark Town Hall.

Other public buildings included hospitals (e.g., Lincoln and York), racecourse grandstands (e.g. York, Doncaster and Nottingham), (all now demolished), and prisons at Wakefield and Northallerton. He designed new churches as well as repairing old ones. The former were all privately financed, the latter were financed by the existing parishes. His single span roof construction allowed him to build the new churches without the traditional subdivision into nave and aisles.

He served as bridgemaster for both the North and West Ridings of Yorkshire, leaving a legacy of countless bridges the majority of which still stand today. The more than 60 bridges built or altered by Carr still serve the backbone of North Yorkshire's road transport network.  Carr was Lord Mayor of York in 1770 and 1785.

His commissions for country houses included model villages and farms, stable blocks, a variety of gate lodges and gateways, garden temples and other ornamental buildings. Notable among them his works for the estates of Harewood and Wentworth Woodhouse.

He took particular care with their planning and construction to maximise value for money for both the immediate patron and for the buildings' future long-term maintenance. He used traditional materials and methods of construction where these had proved sound, but adopted new methods and materials where these could be shown to have an advantage. His training as a stonemason naturally led him to build in that material. In particular he enjoyed using 'great' stones as at Tabley House.  He liked well proportioned rooms which were satisfactory living spaces with or without decorative enrichment. In his view the latter could be provided later if money permitted. As a result, most of his buildings were completed and because of the soundness of construction most survive.

Among the buildings accessible in whole or part to the public today are Buxton Crescent, Newark Town Hall, virtually all his bridges, Harewood House, Tabley House, Clifton House (a museum in Rotherham), Lytham Hall and Fairfax House at 27 Castlegate York, now the headquarters of York Civic Trust.

Influences

During his long career there were several major changes in architectural style. His early work is a mixture of the Palladian and the Rococo. He then sought a purer Antique Roman style with occasional French influences before adapting the currently fashionable style associated with Robert Adam. At the end of his life he returned to the bolder Palladian style of his youth but with detail that looked forward to 19th-century usage.

Carr's work was influenced by the books of Sebastiano Serlio and Andrea Palladio. He subscribed to many architectural pattern books, including those of his friend George Richardson, and also contemporary publications by Robert Morris and William Chambers.

List of works

Public buildings

(dem = demolished) in chronological order, county given if not Yorkshire
York The Pikeing Well-House New Walk 1752–56
York Grandstand Knavesmire Racecourse 1755–56 dem
Beverley Assembly Rooms, 1761–63 dem
Wakefield, The House of Correction, 1766–70 dem
Leeds, The General Infirmary, 1768–71 dem
Oporto, Portugal, The Hospital de Santo António 1769-c. 1843
Newark Town Hall, Newark, Notts., Town Hall, Assembly Rooms and Market Hall, 1773–76
York, Assize Courts, now York Crown Court 1773–77
York County Lunatic Asylum, 1774–77
Lincoln County Hospital, Lincs., 1776
Doncaster, Racecourse Grandstand, 1777–81 dem
Nottingham, racecourse grandstand, 1777 dem
Nottingham, Notts., Assembly Rooms, 1778 dem
Kelso, Roxburghs., design for Racecourse Grandstand, 1778 (built in 1822)	
Buxton, Derbys., The Assembly Rooms in the Crescent 1779–90
York, The Female Prison, 1780–83
Northallerton, Court House, 1784–88 dem
Northallerton, House of Correction 1784–88
Chesterfield, Derbys., Town Hall, 1787–88 dem
Lismore, County Waterford in Ireland, design for court building, today a heritage centre 1799

Churches

Ravenfield, 1756;
Kirkleatham, Payment for design, 1759;
Dewsbury Minster, Partly rebuilt 1765–7;
Bierley, 1766; attributed:
Boynton, largely rebuilt 1768–70;
York Minster, survey and repairs 1770-3 and 1794–97; Joseph Halfpenny was clerk of works on this project
Sheffield, St. Peter, alterations 1773–5;
Rokeby, completed church 1777–8;
Denton, 1776; attributed
Holy Rood Church, Ossington, Notts., 1782–3;
St Peter and St Leonard's Church, Horbury, 1790–4.

Bridges

North and East Ridings of Yorkshire 
Aysgarth (R.Ure), 1788;
Ayton (R.Derwent), 1775;
Bainbridge (Yore Bridge, River Ure, (1793) and Bain Bridge, River Bain, (widened 1785))
Birdforth (Birdforth Beck) 1798dem;
Bow Bridge,	(R.Rye), 1789;
Catterick (R.Swale) 1792;
Crambeck 1785;	
Croft (R. Tees), 1795;
Danby Wiske, 1782;
Downholme, (R.Swale), 1773;
East Row,Sandsend, nr. Whitby, 1777;
Ellerbeck, nr. Osmotherley, 1790;
Greta, nr.Rokeby, 1773;
Grinton (R.Swale), 1797;
Hawnby (R.Rye), 1800;
Howsham Bridge not executed
Kilvington (Spital Beck), 1774dem;
Kirkham Bridge not executed	
Low Bourn (R.Burn), nr. Masham 1775;
Morton on Swale (R.Swale), 1800–3;
South Otterington (R.Wiske) 1776;
Reeth (Arkle Beck), 1772–3;
Riccall, nr. Helmsley, 1803;
Richmond (R.Swale), 1789;
Rutherford (R.Greta), 1773;
Skeeby nr. Richmond, 1782;
Skipton on Swale, 1783;
Strensall, (R.Foss), 1798,
Thirkleby, 1799;
Thirsk Mill, Millgate, (over Cod Beck) 1789;
York, Yearsley Bridge (R.Foss) 1794–5;

West Riding 
Carlton Ferry, nr. Snaith, (R.Aire)1774;
Coniston Cold, (R.Aire), 1763;
Ferrybridge, (R.Aire), 1797–1804) ;
Marle Bridge (R.Dearne), nr. Darfield, 1766;
Selby, 1795 in part for the wooden bridge at.

Private bridges
 	
Blyth, Notts., dated 1776, (now public);
Denton Park, c. 1770;
Harewood Park, Yorks. c. 1771;
Norton Place Park, Lincs., c. 1776;
Unexecuted bridge designs for Wentworth Woodhouse, Yorks.

Domestic architecture

(The following are in Yorkshire, unless otherwise stated)
The New Lodge, New Lodge, Barnsley (c.1760) – built as a dwelling for John Carr himself
Kirby Hall, Ouseburn, 1747-c.55, dem.
Huthwaite Hall, Thurgoland, 1748;
Askham Hall, Askham Richard, Yorks.,  c. 1750 dem;
Thorp Arch Hall, 1750–4;
Gledhow Hall, Gledhow, Roundhay, Leeds c. 1764 for J. Dixon;
Arncliffe Hall, Ingleby Arncliffe, c. 1750–4;
York, No. 47, Bootham, 1752;
Campsmount, Campsall near Doncaster, 1752-5 dem;
Leeds, town house for J. Dixon 1753; Northallerton, 84 High Street, c.1754.
Heath Hall, near Wakefield, 1754–80;
York, Petergate, house for J. Mitchell, 1755 dem;
York, Fairfax House, 27 Castlegate, circa 1755–62; Gilling Castle
Howsham Mill, near Malton, c. 1755;
Plompton Hall, near Knaresborough, c. 1755–62;
York, Garforth House, No. 54 Micklegate, c. 1755–7;
Lytham Hall, Lancs., 1757–64;
Goldsborough Hall, remodelling, c. 1750s;
Newby Hall, remodelling, c. 1758–60;
Everingham Hall1758-64;
Kirklees Hall, alterations, 1759–60;
Harewood House, 1755–71; (except the decoration of the principal rooms)
Harewood village and other estate buildings;
Kirkland Hall, near Garstang, Lancs. 1760 ; attributed:
Ravenfield Hall, near Rotherham, alterations, 1760–70 dem;
Tabley House, Cheshire, c. 1760–7;
Hornby Castle, c. 1760–70 partly dem;
Wentworth Woodhouse, c. 1760- 1804,completed the house, and numerous important estate buildings.
Clints Hall nr. Richmond, dem,
Castlegate House, Castlegate, York 1762–3;
Campsall Hall, alterations, 1762-4 dem;
Stapleton Park, c. 1762-4 dem;
Grove Hall, near Retford, Nottinghamshire remodelled c. 1762 dem;
Constable Burton Hall, c. 1762–8;
Escrick Park, remodelled, 1763–5;
White Windows, Sowerby Bridge, 1763–8;
Welbeck Abbey, Nottinghamshire 1763, 1774–7;
Cannon Hall near Barnsley, 1764, 1778 onwards;
Goldsborough Hall nr. Knaresborough, internal alterations, 1764–5;
Swinton Park, nr. Masham, alterations 1764–7;
Kirkleatham Hall, remodelling, 1764-7dem;
Swarland Hall, near Felton, Northumberland, 1765 dem; attributed
Courteenhall, Northamptonshire, stables, after 1765;
York, Skeldergate, his own house, 1765-9 dem;
Aske Hall, c. 1765–9;
Boynton Hall near Bridlington, c.1765–80;
Fangfoss Hall, East Yorkshire c.1766-;
Halifax, Somerset House and warehouse, c. 1766;
Towneley Hall, Lancashire, interiors, 1766–7,
Pye Nest near Halifax, 1767dem;
Thoresby Hall, Nottinghamshire. 1767–71 dem;
Castle William, Budby Nottinghamshire, Thoresby Hall Estate c 1767
Auckland Castle, Bishop Auckland, County Durham, alterations c.1767–72; attributed
Raby Castle, County Durham, remodelled, 1768–88;
Leeds, Bridge End, house for Mr. Green, before 1769;
Kilnwick Hall, remodelled 1769–72, 1781 dem;
Townend Farm, Kilnwick 1770;
The Shay, nr. Halifax, c. 1770dem;
Byram Hall and farm, nr.Ferrybridge, remodelled c. 1770, largely dem;
Gledstone Hall and stables nr. Skipton, c. 1770 house dem; attributed:
Aston Rectory, near Rotherham, c. 1770;
Somerby Hall, Somerby, Lincolnshire monument ashlar doric column topped by an urn for Edward Weston
Sedbury Park, near Richmond, alterations c.1770 house dem;
Denton Hall, Wharfedale, 1769–81;
Chesters, near Hexham, Northumberland, 1771;
Aston Hall near Rotherham, 1760s;
Thirsk Hall, additions, 1771–3;
London, Burlington House, Piccadilly, internal alterations, c. 1771-5dem;
Ormesby Hall near Middlesbrough, stables and entrance lodge, c. 1772; attributed:
Redbourne Hall, Lincolnshire, alterations, 1773;
Blyth Hall, Nottinghamshire, 1773-6dem;
Leventhorpe Hall, near Leeds,1774;
Castle Howard, alterations and stables, 1774–82;
Panton Hall, near Wragby, Lincolnshire, remodelling, 1775dem;
Ribston Hall, near Knaresborough, alterations and stables, c. 1775; attributed
Norton Place, Bishop Norton, Lincolnshire 1776;
Billing Hall, Great Billing, Northamptonshire, 1776 dem;
Basildon Park, Berkshire, 1776;
Colwick Hall, Nottinghamshire, remodelled 1776;
Middleton Lodge, Middleton Tyas, 1777–80;
Sledmere, Castle Farm and designs for Sledmere House 1778;
Clifton Hall, Notts. alterations, 1778–97;
Staunton in the Vale Hall, Nottinghamshire, alterations 1778 -85;
Bolling Hall, near Bradford, alterations 1779 -80;
Thornes House, near Wakefield, designs for house, 1779-81dem;
Langford Hall, Nottinghamshire c. 1780;
Badsworth Hall, c. 1780dem;
New Lodge, Wakefield Road, Barnsley, c. 1780;
Wiganthorpe Hall, near Malton, c. 1780dem;
Buxton, Derbyshire, The Crescent, St. Ann's Well, and Great Stables. 1779–90;
Grimston Garth, near Aldborough, 1781–6;
Chatsworth House, Derbyshire, internal redecoration, c. 1782–4; (and for the same patron, the repair of Hardwick Hall).
Clifton House, Rotherham,1783;
Holker Hall, near Cartmel, Lancashire, minor works c. 1783, 1787;
Workington Hall, Cumberland, extensive remodelling, 1783–91
Belle Isle, Windermere, for the same patron. and minor changes to
Cradside House Scotland.
Sand Hutton Park, 1786dem;
Eastwood House, Rotherham, 1786-7dem;
Farnley Hall, near Otley, major extension, 1786–90;
Castle William, Budby, Nottinghamshire, c. 1789;
Durham Castle, remodelled gateway 1791;
Bretton Hall, alterations, 1790s;
Leck Hall, c.1790s
Wood Hall, near Wetherby, c. 1795;
Fawley Court, Buckinghamshire, lodges, 1797–9;
Belle Vue (Claife Viewing Station) near Hawkshead, Lancashire, belvedere c. 1799;
Coolattin Park (Malton House), Shillelagh, County Wicklow, Ireland 1800–1808;
"Milton Hall, near Peterborough, Northamptonshire, internal alterations c. 1803 and orangery, 1788–9;
Upleatham Hall, alterations, date uncertain;
Tankersley Park, temple, date uncertain;
Obelisk and monument: Knox's Hill, Armagh, 1782–3;
Bramham Park, after 1773; attributed:
Wall monument, Otley All Saints, to Francis Fawkes of Farnley Hall, 1754, signed J Carr.
Wall monument design for Buxton family (Goodchild Collection Wakefield)
Wood Hall Yorkshire
Chevet Hall, Wakefield (dem) and stable block
Hook Moor Lodges, Great North Road A1 Aberford, West Yorkshire, part of the Parlington Hall Estate;

References

Further reading

External links

 Photographs of Colwick Hall, Nottinghamshire from Nottingham21
John Carr page on History of York website

People from Horbury
1723 births
1807 deaths
Lord Mayors of York
18th-century English architects
Architects from Yorkshire